Ying Ting (b. August 23, 1938 Hong Kong) is a Chinese actress from Hong Kong. Ting is credited with over 75 films.

Career 
In 1955, Ting began her film career with the Liberty Film Company release of Queen of the Stage, a 1955 Comedy directed by Lee Ying-yuen. Ting was active in 1950's and 1960's and many leading roles in Cantonese dialect films. Ting played Yeung Wai-Fung in Factory Queen (aka Queen of the Factory; Three Love Affairs), a 1963 Comedy film directed by Mok Hong-see, and  Leung Chui-Chun in Dim-Sum Queen (aka Queen of Tea House), a 1965 Romantic Comedy directed by Mok Hong-see. From 1959 to 1966, Ting was the only contracted female artist of Lan Kwong Film Company, where she was a leading actress for many films directed by Mok Hong-see. In the late 1960s, Ting also appeared in Mandarin dialect films such as Tigress is Coming, a 1968 martial arts film directed by Wu Pang. Ting's last Hong Kong film as a lead was Man Ghost Fox, a 1969 Fantasy Ghost film directed by Chou Hsu-chiang.

Filmography

Films 
This is a partial list of films.
 1955 Queen of the Stage 
 1960 Three Females - Leung Kit-Fong.
 1961 Woman's Affairs - Chui Lai-Ping 
 1962 Secrets Between Husband and Wife (aka Happy Couples) 
 1963 Factory Queen (aka Queen of the Factory; Three Love Affairs) - Yeung Wai-Fung 
 1965 Dim-Sum Queen (aka Queen of Tea House) - Leung Chui-Chun 
 1966 The International Secret Agents'' - Maria 
 1967 Tender Tears - Chiu Siu-Wan. 
 1967 Three Women in a Factory - Yam Kim-Ying. 
 1968 Tigress is Coming
 1969 Man Ghost Fox

References

External links 
 Ying Ting at imdb.com
 Ting Ying at hkcinemagic.com
 Ting Ying at allmovie.com
 Ting Ying in Hong Kong Cinema: A Cross-cultural View, page 256
 Ting Ying visited Lee Man Rubber plant in 1963 at industrialhistoryhk.org
 Oral History Series (5): An Emerging Modernity: Hong Kong Cinema of the 1960s (In Chinese)

1938 births
Hong Kong film actresses
Living people